Savalan is a village and municipality in the Qabala Rayon of Azerbaijan with a population of 294.  Since 2007 the Savalan Valley, between the Turyanchay and Garachay rivers has given its name to a major new Azerbaijani wine with a new grape processing plant on the Agdash-Qabala road at nearby Qaradeyin.

References 

Populated places in Qabala District